Kaliyan or Kalian or Kalyan or Kaleyan, in Iran, may refer to:
 Kalyan, Meyaneh, East Azerbaijan Province
 Kalian, Sarab, East Azerbaijan Province
 Kalyan, Varzaqan, East Azerbaijan Province
 Kaliyan, Kerman
 Kalian-e Olya, Kermanshah Province
 Kalian-e Sofla, Kermanshah Province
 Kalian-e Vosta, Kermanshah Province
 Kaleyan, Zanjan